L'aventure, c'est l'aventure is a 1972 French film directed by Claude Lelouch. Starring Lino Ventura and popular singers Jacques Brel and Johnny Hallyday, it recounts the adventures of five criminals who progress from conventional urban crime to international notoriety as celebrity kidnappers. The film was screened at the 1972 Cannes Film Festival, but wasn't entered into the main competition.

Plot 
In Paris in 1972, a group of five career criminals realise that the rewards from their traditional way of life are shrinking in the modern world. Lino, for example, finds that his prostitutes want to be independent entrepreneurs recognised by the state. Jacques accepts that his bank robberies yield a low net return for high risks. After much discussion, the five settle on celebrity kidnaps. Their first target is the singer Johnny Hallyday, who is delighted at the publicity and himself writes them a huge ransom cheque.

Decamping with the proceeds to Latin America, they are hired by left-wing guerillas to kidnap the Swiss ambassador. The government agree to free twenty imprisoned revolutionaries in exchange for his release. When Ernesto, leader of the rebels, refuses to pay the kidnappers' fee, they kidnap him and sell his freedom for cash to three separate buyers; his soldiers, the government, and the CIA.

The gang decamp with the proceeds to the USA, where they hijack a 747 and return it for a fee in millions. Taking a holiday break on a yacht, they are hailed by five beauties in a speedboat. When the couples have paired off, Ernesto's soldiers scramble aboard. Under torture, the five men tell him how to access their Swiss bank account. Once he has their money, he hands them over to the French police, who put the five on trial.

Their defence lawyer craftily claims that the trial is political rather than criminal. Worried, the justice minister arranges for them to escape and fly out of the country. Landing in Africa, their skills are in immediate demand. The army is planning a coup on the day after the Pope arrives for a visit. The gang kidnap the Pope at the airport and demand that every Catholic in the world must contribute at least one dollar for his release.

Cast 
 Lino Ventura – Lino Massaro
 Jacques Brel – Jacques
 Charles Denner – Simon Duroc
 Johnny Hallyday – Himself
 Charles Gérard – Charlot
 Aldo Maccione – Aldo
 Nicole Courcel – Nicole
 Yves Robert – L'avocat de la défense
 André Falcon – The ambassador
 Juan Luis Buñuel – Ernesto Juarez
 Gordon Heath	
 Prudence Harrington – The ambassador's wife
 Maddly Bamy – Une vacancière (credited as Madly Bamy)
 Sophie Boudet – Une vacancière
 Annie Ho – Une vacancière (credited as Annie Hau)
 Annie Kerani – Une vacancière
 Xavier Gélin – Lino's son
 Sevim Joyce		
 Jean Berger		
 Henry Czarniak – Le motard
 Gérard Sire – L'avocat général
 Michele Alet (uncredited)
 Catherine Allégret – Une militante (uncredited)
 Elie Chouraqui – A revolutionary (uncredited)
 Jean Collomb – The Pope (uncredited)
 Georges Cravenne – Le président du tribunal (uncredited)
 Eva Damien – L'experte en politique (uncredited)
 Michel Drucker – Himself (uncredited)
 El Kebir – Un militant (uncredited)
 Arlette Gordon – The flight attendant (uncredited)
 Sylvain Joubert – Un militant (uncredited)
 Pierre Kast (uncredited)
 Alexandre Mnouchkine – Davis (uncredited)
 Jacques Paoli – Himself (uncredited)
 Roger Rudel – An official in the car (uncredited)
 Lionel Vitrant – Man on a bicycle (uncredited)

References

External links 

French comedy films
1972 films
Films directed by Claude Lelouch
Films about kidnapping in France
Jacques Brel
Films scored by Francis Lai
1972 comedy films
1970s French films